Chavanel is a surname. Notable people with the surname include:

 Sébastien Chavanel (born 1981), French cyclist, brother of Sylvain
 Sylvain Chavanel (born 1979), French cyclist